Paidimadugu is a village in Korutla Mandal in Jagtial district of Telangana State, India. It is located 31 km from Jagityal.

Demographics

Telugu is the local language  and the total population numbers 4250. Males are 2037 and females are 2,213 living in 1051 houses. Total area of Paidimadugu is 1114 hectares.

References

Villages in Jagtial district